Jeff Machat MD, FRCSC, DABO is an ophthalmologist in the United States and Canada specializing in surgical vision correction better known as refractive eye surgery.

Education
Machat received his Doctor of Medicine degree from the University of Toronto in 1986 and his Royal College of Canada Certification in Ophthalmology in 1990 from the same alma mater. Machat is a Diplomate of the American Board of Ophthalmology, a member of the American Academy of Ophthalmology (AAO), the American Society of Cataract and Refractive Surgery (ASCRS), the International Society of Refractive Surgery (ISRS), the European Society of Cataract and Refractive Surgery (ESCRS), the Canadian Society of Cataract and Refractive Surgery (CRCRS), and the Royal College of Physicians and Surgeons of Canada. Machat has lectured extensively at the AAO, ASCRS, ESCRS, and the Asia Pacific Academy of Ophthalmology.

Career
Machat was one of the first ophthalmologists in North America to perform laser vision correction in 1991 and the first to perform wavefront-guided LASIK in Canada on March 6, 2000. Machat was also the first refractive surgeon to use the Intralase femtosecond laser for flap creation in March 2003. Machat was instrumental in the development of software, techniques and surgical instruments for LASIK and PRK. He is the originator of the Acoustic Shockwave model to explain Central Island formation and the pretreatment technique to counteract their occurrence. Machat has been quoted in Ophthalmology Times, Ocular Surgery News, Eyeworld, Cataract and Refractive Surgery Today, and has been featured on the CNN evening news.  Machat's patients have included (Terry Meeuwsen (Anchor 700 Club), Bob Rae (former Ontario Premier), Dan Meyers (President-North America Ophthalmics-CIBA Vision Corporation), Michael Wilson (former Finance Minister), Dr. Anthony Sensoli, MD, Dr. Brad Britton, Dr. Scott Jaben, Dr. John Mitchell, MD, Dr. Randel Rabon, NBA Basketball star Emanuel Davis, and NHL Hockey star Bob Rouse.

Machat is the founder and CEO of Crystal Clear Vision at which he serves since 2012. In 2015, Jeff Machat joined Nvision Eye Centers and continues to work there under leadership of Dr. Tom Tooma.

Books
Machat is primary author of the textbook Excimer Laser Refractive Surgery-Practice and Principles cited in peer-reviewed ophthalmic publications. Machat is also the co-author of The Art of LASIK.

References

American ophthalmologists
Canadian ophthalmologists
Living people
University of Toronto alumni
Fellows of the Royal College of Physicians and Surgeons of Canada
Year of birth missing (living people)